The first season of the television series Lud, Zbunjen, Normalan aired between September 2, 2007 and June 1, 2008 on FTV in Bosnia. The season was produced and distributed by BabaFilm with series creator Feda Isovic as the script writer and executive producer.

The series focuses on three generations of the Fazlinović family: Izet Fazlinović (Mustafa Nadarević) as the patriarch of the Fszlinovic family, his son, Faruk (Senad Bašić), and Faruk's son, Damir (Moamer Kasumović), and since season 4, Damir's son, Džebra. They all live in Sarajevo in an apartment complex. In season 4, Damir moved next to Izet's apartment with his wife.

The season contained 40 episodes. It received overwhelming praise across Bosnia and later Croatia and Serbia. The rating led FTV to renew the series midway though the first season.

Cast

Episodes

References

Lud, zbunjen, normalan
2007 Bosnia and Herzegovina television seasons
2008 Bosnia and Herzegovina television seasons